Death by crushing or pressing is a method of execution that has a history during which the techniques used varied greatly from place to place, generally involving placing heavy weights upon a person with the intent to kill.

Crushing by elephant

A common method of death throughout South and Southeast Asia for over 4,000 years was crushing by elephants. The Sasanians, Romans, and Carthaginians also used this method on occasion.

Ancient Rome
In the early history of ancient Rome, Tarpeia was a Roman maiden who betrayed the city of Rome to the Sabines in exchange for what she thought would be a reward of jewelry. She was instead crushed to death and her body cast from the Tarpeian Rock which now bears her name.

Crushing in pre-Columbian America
Crushing is also reported from pre-Columbian America, notably in the Aztec Empire.

Crushing under common law

Peine forte et dure (Law French for "forceful and hard punishment") was a method of torture formerly used in the common law legal system, in which a defendant who refused to plead ("stood mute") would be subjected to having heavier and heavier stones placed upon his or her chest until a plea was entered, or as the weight of the stones on the chest became too great for the condemned to breathe, fatal suffocation would occur.

The common law courts originally took a very limited view of their own jurisdiction. They considered themselves to lack jurisdiction over a defendant until he had voluntarily submitted to it by entering a plea seeking judgment from the court. Since a criminal justice system that tried and punished only those who volunteered for trial and punishment was practically unworkable, this was the means chosen to coerce them.

Many defendants charged with capital offences nonetheless refused to plead, since thereby they would escape forfeiture of property, and their heirs would still inherit their estate; but if the defendant pleaded guilty and was executed, their heirs would inherit nothing, their property escheating to the Crown. Peine forte et dure was abolished in Great Britain in 1772, and the last known use of the practice was in 1741. In 1772, refusing to plead was deemed to be equivalent to pleading guilty. This was changed in 1827 to being deemed a plea of not guilty. Today, in all common law jurisdictions, standing mute is treated by the courts as equivalent to a plea of not guilty.

The elaborate procedure was recorded by a 15th-century witness in an oft-quoted description: "he will lie upon his back, with his head covered and his feet, and one arm will be drawn to one quarter of the house with a cord, and the other arm to another quarter, and in the same manner it will be done with his legs; and let there be laid upon his body iron and stone, as much as he can bear, or more ..."

"Pressing to death" might take several days, and not necessarily with a continued increase in the load. The Frenchman Guy Miege, who from 1668 taught languages in London says the following about the English practice:

The most famous case in the United Kingdom was that of Roman Catholic martyr St Margaret Clitherow, who, in order to avoid a trial in which her own children would be obliged to give evidence, was pressed to death on March 25, 1586, after refusing to plead to the charge of having harboured Catholic priests in her house. She died within fifteen minutes under a weight of at least . Several hardened criminals, including William Spigott (1721) and Edward Burnworth, lasted half an hour under  before pleading to the indictment. Others, such as Major Strangways (1658) and John Weekes (1731), refused to plead, even under , and were killed when bystanders, out of mercy, sat on them.

The only death by peine forte et dure in American history was Giles Corey, who was pressed to death on September 19, 1692, during the Salem witch trials, after he refused to enter a plea in the judicial proceeding. According to legend, his last words as he was being crushed were "More weight", and he was thought to be dead as the weight was applied.

In medieval Europe, the slow crushing of body parts in screw-operated "bone vises" of iron was a common method of torture, and a tremendous variety of cruel instruments were used to savagely crush the head, knee, hand, and, most commonly, either the thumb or the naked foot. Such instruments were finely threaded and variously provided with spiked inner surfaces or heated red-hot before their application to the limb to be tortured.

In popular culture
Peine forte et dure is referred to in Arthur Miller's political drama The Crucible (1953), where Giles Corey is pressed to death after refusing to plead "aye or nay" to the charge of witchcraft. In the 1996 film version of this play, the screenplay also written by Arthur Miller, Corey is crushed to death for refusing to reveal the name of a source of information.

In the 1970 American made-for-television supernatural horror film, Crowhaven Farm, directed by Walter Grauman and starring Hope Lange, Paul Burke and John Carradine, a coven uses crushing to torture Lange's character after she inherits a haunted Massachusetts farm house.

In The Dark Pictures Anthology: Little Hope, one of the flashback victims Joseph Lambert is subjected to the peine forte et dure method of crushing, therefore becoming the "crushed demon" that stalks his reincarnation John later in the game.

See also
 Stoning
 Cement shoes
 Crush syndrome

References

Further reading
McKenzie, Andrea. "'This Death Some Strong and Stout Hearted Man Doth Choose': The Practice of Peine Forte et Dure in Seventeenth- and Eighteenth-Century England". Law and History Review, Summer 2005, Vol. 23, No. 2, pp. 279–313.

External links
 Forfeiture in England and Colonial America
 The Proceedings of the Old Bailey, Reference Number: t16760823-6 (23 August 1676)

Execution methods
Torture